Cobalt(II) chloride is an inorganic compound of cobalt and chlorine, with the formula . The compound forms several hydrates ·n, for n = 1, 2, 6, and 9. Claims of the formation of tri- and tetrahydrates have not been confirmed. The anhydrous form is a blue crystalline solid; the dihydrate is purple and the hexahydrate is pink. Commercial samples are usually the hexahydrate, which is one of the most commonly used cobalt compounds in the lab.

Properties

Anhydrous
At room temperature, anhydrous cobalt chloride has the cadmium chloride structure (Rm) in which the cobalt(II) ions are octahedrally coordinated. At about 706 °C (20 degrees below the melting point), the coordination is believed to change to tetrahedral. The vapor pressure has been reported as 7.6 mmHg at the melting point.

Solutions
Cobalt chloride is fairly soluble in water.

Diluted aqueous solutions of  contain the species , besides chloride ions.  Concentrated solutions are red at room temperature but become blue at higher temperatures.

Hydrates
The crystal unit of the solid hexahydrate •6 contains the neutral molecule trans- and two molecules of water of crystallization. This species dissolves readily in water and alcohol.

The anhydrous salt is hygroscopic and the hexahydrate is deliquescent.
The dihydrate, CoCl2(H2O)2, is a coordination polymer.  Each Co center is coordinated to four doubly bridging chloride ligands.  The octahedron is completed by a pair of mutually trans aquo ligands.

Preparation
Cobalt chloride can be prepared in aqueous solution from cobalt(II) hydroxide or cobalt(II) carbonate and hydrochloric acid:
 + 2 HCl(aq) → (aq)  +    +  

 + 2 HCl(aq)  → (aq)  +  2

The solid dihydrate and hexahydrate can be obtained by evaporation.  Cooling saturated aqueous solutions yields the dihydrate between 120.2 °C and 51.25 °C, and the hexahydrate below 51.25 °C. Water ice, rather than cobalt chloride, will crystallize from solutions with concentration below 29%. The monohydrate and the anhydrous forms can be obtained by cooling solutions only under high pressure, above 206 °C and 335 °C, respectively.

The anhydrous compound can be prepared by heating the hydrates.

On rapid heating or in a closed container, each of the 6-, 2-, and 1- hydrates partially melts into a mixture of the next lower hydrate and a saturated solution—at 51.25 °C, 206 °C, and 335 °C, respectively. On slow heating in an open container, so that the water vapor pressure over the solid is practically zero, water evaporates out of each of the solid 6-, 2-, and 1- hydrates, leaving the next lower hydrate, at about 40°C, 89°C, and 125°C, respectively.  If the partial pressure of the water vapor is in equilibrium with the solid, as in a confined but not pressurized contained, the decomposition occurs at about 115°C, 145°C, and 195°C, respectively.

Dehydration can also be effected with trimethylsilyl chloride:
•6 + 12  →  + 6 + 12 HCl

The anhydrous compound can be purified by sublimation in vacuum.

Reactions
In the laboratory, cobalt(II) chloride serves as a common precursor to other cobalt compounds. Generally, diluted aqueous solutions of the salt behave like other cobalt(II) salts since these solutions consist of the  ion regardless of the anion. For example, such solutions give a precipitate of cobalt sulfide  upon treatment with hydrogen sulfide .

Complexed chlorides
The hexahydrate and the anhydrous salt are weak Lewis acids.  The adducts are usually either octahedral or tetrahedral. It forms an octahedral complex with pyridine:
·6 + 4   →   + 6 
With triphenylphosphine, a tetrahedral complex results:
·6 + 2  →  + 6 

Salts of the anionic complex CoCl42− can be prepared using tetraethylammonium chloride:
 + 2 [(C2H5)4N]Cl → [(C2H5)4N)]2[CoCl4]
The tetracolbaltate ion [CoCl4]2− is the blue ion that forms upon addition of hydrochloric acid to aqueous solutions of hydrated cobalt chloride, which are pink.

Reduction

Reaction of the anhydrous compound with sodium cyclopentadienide gives cobaltocene . This 19-electron species is a good reducing agent, being readily oxidised to the yellow 18-electron cobaltacenium cation .

Oxidation to cobalt(III)
Compounds of cobalt in the +3 oxidation state exist, such as cobalt(III) fluoride , nitrate , and sulfate ; however, cobalt(III) chloride  is not stable in normal conditions, and would decompose immediately into  and chlorine.

On the other hand, cobalt(III) chlorides can be obtained if the cobalt is bound also to other ligands of greater Lewis basicity than chloride, such as amines.  For example, in the presence of ammonia, cobalt(II) chloride is readily oxidised by atmospheric oxygen to hexamminecobalt(III) chloride:
4 ·6 + 4 Cl + 20  +  → 4  + 26 
Similar reactions occur with other amines.  These reactions are often performed in the presence of charcoal as a catalyst, or with hydrogen peroxide  substituted for atmospheric oxygen. Other highly basic ligands, including carbonate, acetylacetonate, and oxalate, induce the formation of Co(III) derivatives. Simple carboxylates and halides do not.

Unlike Co(II) complexes, Co(III) complexes are very slow to exchange ligands, so they are said to be kinetically inert. The German chemist Alfred Werner was awarded the Nobel prize in 1913 for his studies on a series of these cobalt(III) compounds, work that led to an understanding of the structures of such coordination compounds.

Oxidation to cobalt(IV)
Reaction of 1-norbornyllithium with the ·THF in pentane produces the brown, thermally stable tetrakis(1-norbornyl)cobalt(IV) — a rare example of a stable transition metal/saturated alkane compound, different products are obtained in other solvents.

Moisture indication 

Cobalt chloride is a common visual moisture indicator due to its distinct colour change when hydrated. The colour change is from some shade of blue when dry, to a pink when hydrated, although the shade of colour depends on the substrate and concentration. It is impregnated into paper to make test strips for detecting moisture in solutions, or more slowly, in air/gas. Desiccants such as silica gel can incorporate cobalt chloride to indicate when it is "spent" (i.e. hydrated).

Health issues
Cobalt is essential for most higher forms of life, but more than a few milligrams each day is harmful.  Although poisonings have rarely resulted from cobalt compounds, their chronic ingestion has caused serious health problems at doses far less than the lethal dose. In 1966, the addition of cobalt compounds to stabilize beer foam in Canada led to a peculiar form of toxin-induced cardiomyopathy, which came to be known as beer drinker's cardiomyopathy.

Furthermore, cobalt(II) chloride is suspected of causing cancer (i.e., possibly carcinogenic, IARC Group 2B) as per the International Agency for Research on Cancer (IARC) Monographs.

In 2005–06, cobalt chloride was the eighth-most-prevalent allergen in patch tests (8.4%).

Other uses
Invisible ink: when suspended in solution, cobalt(II) chloride can be made to appear invisible on a surface; when that same surface is subsequently exposed to significant heat (such as from a handheld heat gun or lighter) the ink permanently/ irreversibly changes to blue.
Cobalt chloride is an established chemical inducer of hypoxia-like responses such as erythropoiesis.  Cobalt supplementation is not banned and therefore would not be detected by current anti-doping testing. Cobalt chloride is a banned substance under the Australian Thoroughbred Racing Board.
Cobalt chloride is one method used to induce pulmonary arterial hypertension in animals for research and evaluation of treatment efficacy.

References

External links

International Chemical Safety Card 0783
National Pollutant Inventory – Cobalt fact sheet
IARC Monograph "Cobalt and Cobalt Compounds"

Cobalt(II) compounds
Inorganic compounds
Chlorides
Metal halides
IARC Group 2B carcinogens
Deliquescent substances